Steve Sashihara (born December 13, 1957) is an American business consultant and author who writes about optimization, business process improvement and IT-driven innovation. He is the president and CEO of Princeton Consultants, which he co-founded in 1980 after graduating from Princeton University.

Work
Because optimization spans multiple technical fields, it can be labeled as mathematical optimization, advanced analytics, operations research or artificial intelligence.

Sashihara wrote that The Optimization Edge: Reinventing Decision Making to Maximize All Your Company’s Assets:

Brian Deagon of Investor's Business Daily wrote: 

Sashihara has contributed articles to The European Financial Review and M World, The Journal of the American Management Association.  
He has  been interviewed for video news outlets such as CFO Studio and Soundview Executive Book Summaries.  He is a frequent guest speaker on the subjects of optimization and Big Data at events conducted by the Association of Management Consulting Firms (AMCF), the Institute for Operations Research and the Management Sciences (INFORMS), IBM and other organizations and businesses. 
He is currently a director of AMCF and an officer of the INFORMS Roundtable.

Bibliography

References

External links
 The Optimization Edge book website
 Princeton Consultants website

1957 births
Living people
American management consultants